The Ven. John Morgan (1840–1924)  was the Archdeacon of Bangor from 1902 to 1920.

Morgan was educated at Sidney Sussex College, Cambridge, and ordained in 1869.  After curacies in Bangor and Llanberis, he was Vicar of Corris, Rector of Dowlais, Vicar of Bangor, then Rector  of Llandudno before his appointment as Archdeacon. 
 
He died on 1 January 1924.

References

1840 births
Alumni of Sidney Sussex College, Cambridge
Archdeacons of Bangor
1924 deaths